Kevin Vink (born 30 July 1984 in Maassluis) is a Dutch retired footballer. Until summer 2018 played as a striker for Dutch Topklasse side Excelsior Maassluis.

References

External links 
 Kevin Vink profile at VI.nl

1984 births
Living people
Association football forwards
Dutch footballers
RKC Waalwijk players
Excelsior Rotterdam players
Eredivisie players
Eerste Divisie players
Footballers from Maassluis
Excelsior Maassluis players